Srinivasa Ramanujan Institute Of Technology (SRIT)  is a private college in Rotarypuram, Anantapur, Andhra Pradesh, India. It was founded in 2008 by Sambasiva Reddy Aluru. The college is affiliated to Jawaharlal Nehru Technological University, Anantapur. It offers undergraduate and postgraduate courses.

Academics
The college provides four years, full-time B.Tech. courses and postgraduate M.Tech. courses in various engineering fields. Some of the courses are accredited with the National Board of Accreditation (NBA). The institution is accredited by National Assessment and Accreditation Council (NAAC) with A Grade. It is affiliated to Jawaharlal Nehru Technological University, Anantapur.

Facilities
Separate boys and girls hostel is available within the campus. The campus also includes a library and sport facilities. A transportation fleet of 32 buses is also available.

See also
 Education in Andhra Pradesh

References

External links

 Official website

Engineering colleges in Andhra Pradesh
Universities and colleges in Anantapur district
Educational institutions established in 2008
2008 establishments in Andhra Pradesh